The 2011 Asian Air Gun Championships were held in Kuwait City, Kuwait between October 17 and October 23, 2011.

Medal summary

Men

Women

Medal table

References 
General
 ISSF Results Overview

Specific

External links 
 Official site

Asian Shooting Championships
Asian
Shooting
2011 in Kuwaiti sport
21st century in Kuwait City
Sport in Kuwait City
Shooting competitions in Kuwait